Lambley may refer to:
Lambley, Northumberland, England
Lambley railway station
Lambley, Nottinghamshire, England
Matthew Lambley, hammer thrower
Randalph de Lambley
Robyn Lambley, former Deputy Chief Minister of the Northern Territory